Abhaya Naga was King of Anuradhapura in the 3rd century, whose reign lasted from 237 to 245. He succeeded his brother Voharika Tissa as King of Anuradhapura, seizing the throne with assistance from a Tamil army. He was succeeded by his nephew Siri Naga II.

See also
 List of Sri Lankan monarchs
 History of Sri Lanka

References

External links
 Kings & Rulers of Sri Lanka
 Codrington's Short History of Ceylon

Monarchs of Anuradhapura
A
A
A